WYBC-FM (94.3 MHz) is an urban adult contemporary radio station, licensed to New Haven, Connecticut. The station's studios are located on the campus of Yale University. The station is owned by Yale Broadcasting Company and operated through a local marketing agreement (LMA) with Connoisseur Media as of May 10, 2013. Through the LMA, most of WYBC-FM's programming originates from Connoisseur's facilities located on Wheelers Farms Road in Milford. The station's transmitter is located in West Rock Ridge State Park.

History
WYBC-FM Sign-on in 1959.

References

External links 
 
 

YBC
Urban adult contemporary radio stations in the United States
Mass media in New Haven, Connecticut
Connoisseur Media radio stations
Yale University
Radio stations established in 1959
1959 establishments in Connecticut